Yoshihisa "Hisa" Sasagi (born 29 June 1987) is a Samoan rugby union player who currently plays as a prop for  in the ITM Cup.   Despite debuting for the Razorbacks in 2012 it was not until 2015 when he finally established himself as a regular starter.   His performances in helping Otago reach the championship semi-finals saw him named as a member of the  wider training group ahead of the 2016 Super Rugby season. 

Hisa made his debut for the Blues against the hurricanes in round 18 of the 2019 Investec Super Rugby Season, becoming Blues number 303.

Sasagi was born in Samoa but came to Dunedin as a child when his father attended the University of Otago.

References

1987 births
Living people
New Zealand rugby union players
Rugby union props
Otago rugby union players
People educated at Otago Boys' High School
Samoan emigrants to New Zealand
Samoa international rugby union players